Oxychilus is a genus of  small air-breathing land snails, terrestrial pulmonate gastropods in the subfamily Oxychilinae of the family Oxychilidae, the glass snails.

Synonyms
 Aplostoma Moquin-Tandon, 1855
 Cretozonites Kobelt, 1890
 Euhyalina Albers, 1857
 Euhyalinia J. W. Taylor, 1907
 Helicella Gray, 1847
 Hyalina Gray, 1847 (invalid - not Schumacher, 1817 (homonym))
 Hyalina A. Férussac, 1821
 Hyalina (Euhyalina) Albers, 1857
 Hyalinia Charpentier, 1837 (junior synonym)
 Hyalinia (Hyalinia) Charpentier, 1837 (junior synonym)
 Hyalinia (Polita) Held, 1838 (Invalid: junior objective synonym of Oxychilus)
 Hyalofulgida Monterosato, 1892
 Lindholmella C.R. Boettger, 1930
 Omalota Scudder, 1882
 Oxychilops C.R. Boettger, 1930
 Oxychilus (Alzonula) Giusti, 1969 accepted, alternate representation
 Oxychilus (Atlantoxychilus) A. Riedel, 1964· accepted, alternate representation
 Oxychilus (Calloretinella) F. Haas, 1934· accepted, alternate representation
 Oxychilus (Costoxychilus) Neubert, 1998· accepted, alternate representation
 Oxychilus (Drouetia) Gude, 1911· accepted, alternate representation
 Oxychilus (Helicophana) Westerlund, 1886· accepted, alternate representation
 Oxychilus (Hyalocornea) Monterosato, 1892· accepted, alternate representation
 Oxychilus (Hyalofusca) Monterosato, 1892· accepted, alternate representation
 Oxychilus (Longiphallus) A. Riedel, 1958· accepted, alternate representation
 Oxychilus (Ortizius) Forcart, 1957· accepted, alternate representation
 Oxychilus (Oxychilus) Fitzinger, 1833· accepted, alternate representation
 Oxychilus (Radiolus) Wollaston, 1878· accepted, alternate representation
 Oxychilus (Tauroxychilus) Balashov, 2016· accepted, alternate representation
 Polita Held, 1838
 Zonites (Hyalinia) Charpentier, 1837

Species
There are more than 250 accepted names for species (including synonyms) in this genus 
Species in the genus Oxychilus include:

 Oxychilus absoloni (A. J. Wagner, 1914)
 Oxychilus aegopinoides (Maltzan, 1883)
 Oxychilus agostinhoi  Martins, 1981
 Oxychilus albuferensis Altaba, 2007
 Oxychilus alicurensis (Benoit, 1857)
 Oxychilus alliarius (Miller, 1822)
 Oxychilus altimirai A. Riedel, 1972
 Oxychilus amblyopus (J. Mabille, 1869)
 Oxychilus andrei Frias Martins, 2017
 Oxychilus anjana Altonaga, 1986
 † Oxychilus applanatus (K. Miller, 1907) 
 Oxychilus atlanticus (Morelet & Drouët, 1857)
 Oxychilus basajauna Atlonaga, 1990 (uncertain)
 Oxychilus batalhanus de Winter, 1989
 Oxychilus beckmanni Falkner, 2007
 Oxychilus blauneri (Shuttleworth, 1843)
 Oxychilus brincki A. Riedel, 1964
 † Oxychilus brujasensis (Fontannes, 1884) 
 Oxychilus camelinus (Bourguignat, 1852)
 Oxychilus canini (Benoit, 1843)
 Oxychilus caspius (O. Boettger, 1880)
 Oxychilus cellarius (O. F. Müller, 1774)
 † Oxychilus chantrei (Locard, 1878)
 Oxychilus clarus (Held, 1838)
 Oxychilus colliourensis (Locard, 1894)
 Oxychilus concinnus (Westerlund, 1896)
 Oxychilus costatus A. Riedel, 1989
 Oxychilus courquini (Bourguignat, 1870)
 Oxychilus cyprius (L. Pfeiffer, 1847)
 Oxychilus decipiens Riedel, 1966
 Oxychilus deilus (Bourguignat, 1857)
 Oxychilus denatale (L. Pfeiffer, 1856)
 Oxychilus denselineata (P. Hesse, 1914)
 † Oxychilus deplanatus (Thomä, 1845) 
 Oxychilus diaphanellus (Krynicki, 1836)
 Oxychilus diductus (Westerlund, 1886)
 Oxychilus draparnaudi (Beck, 1837)
 Oxychilus edmundi Falkner, 2008
 Oxychilus egadiensis A. Riedel, 1973
 Oxychilus emmae (Akramowski, 1955)
 † Oxychilus falsani (Locard, 1878) 
 † Oxychilus falunorum (Collot, 1911) 
 Oxychilus farinesianus (Bourguignat, 1870)
 Oxychilus filicum (Krynicki, 1836)
 † Oxychilus flavus (Eichwald, 1830) 
 † Oxychilus fleckensteinensis Schlickum & Geissert, 1980 
 Oxychilus furtadoi Frias Martins, 1989
 † Oxychilus globosus (K. Miller, 1907) 
 Oxychilus hobbit A. Riedel, 1981
  †Oxychilus irenae Schlickum & Strauch, 1979 
 Oxychilus juvenostriatus A. Riedel, 1964
 Oxychilus lagrecai Giusti, 1973
 Oxychilus lathyri (J. Mabille, 1869)
 Oxychilus lederi (O. Boettger, 1880)
 Oxychilus lentiformis (Kobelt, 1882)
 Oxychilus lineolatus  Martins & Ripken, 1991
 Oxychilus maceanus (Bourguignat, 1870)
 Oxychilus majori (Westerlund, 1886)
 Oxychilus mariensis  Gittenberger, 2008
 Oxychilus mavromoustakisi (F. Haas, 1934)
 Oxychilus melanoides Frias Martins, 2017
 † Oxychilus mendicus (Slavík, 1869)
 Oxychilus mercadali Gasull, 1970
 Oxychilus miceui Frias Martins, 1989
 Oxychilus micromphalus Frias Martins, 2017
 Oxychilus miguelinus (L. Pfeiffer, 1856)
 Oxychilus mingrelicus (Mousson, 1863)
 Oxychilus minor A. Riedel, 1964
 Oxychilus mortilleti (Pfeiffer, 1859)
 Oxychilus navarricus (Bourguignat, 1870) - formerly known as Oxychilus helveticus (Blum, 1881)
 Oxychilus nortoni (Calcara, 1843)
 Oxychilus obscuratus (A. Villa & J. B. Villa, 1841)
 Oxychilus oglasicola  Giusti, 1968
 Oxychilus oppressus (Shuttleworth, 1877)
 Oxychilus ornatus A. Riedel, 1964
 Oxychilus oschtenicus (O. Boettger, 1888)
 Oxychilus paphlagonicus A. Riedel, 1993
 Oxychilus paulucciae (De Stefani, 1883)
 Oxychilus perspectivus (Kobelt, 1881)
 Oxychilus pilula (Westerlund, 1886)
 Oxychilus pityusanus A. Riedel, 1969
 Oxychilus profundus Neubert, 1998
 Oxychilus rateranus (Servain, 1880)
 Oxychilus renanianus (Pallary, 1939)
 Oxychilus requienii (Moquin-Tandon, 1855)
 Oxychilus reticulatus (O. Boettger, 1883)
 Oxychilus scoliura Frias Martins, 1989
 Oxychilus secernendus (Retowski, 1889)
 Oxychilus shuttleworthianus (Pini, 1883)
 Oxychilus spatiosus (Lindholm, 1922)
 Oxychilus spectabilis (Milne-Edwards, 1885)
 Oxychilus suaneticus (O. Boettger, 1883)
 Oxychilus subeffusus (Boettger, 1879)
 Oxychilus superfluus (L. Pfeiffer, 1849)
 Oxychilus tenerrima (P. Hesse, 1914)
 Oxychilus tomlini (E. A. Smith, 1905)
 Oxychilus translucidus (Mortillet, 1853)
 Oxychilus tropidophorus (J. Mabille, 1869)
 Oxychilus uziellii (Issel, 1872)
 Oxychilus viridescens Frias Martins, Brito & Backeljau, 2013
 Oxychilus volutella (L. Pfeiffer, 1856)
 Oxychilus yartanicus Altaba, 2007

Species brought into synonymy
 Oxychilus amaltheae Riedel & Subai, 1982: synonym of Mediterranea amaltheae (A. Riedel & Subai, 1982) (original combination)
 Oxychilus depressus (Sterki, 1880): synonym of Mediterranea depressa (Sterki, 1880)
 Oxychilus deubeli (A. J. Wagner, 1914) - synonym: Oxychilus orientalis (Clessin, 1887); synonym of Cellariopsis deubeli (A. J. Wagner, 1914)
 Oxychilus glaber (Rossmässler, 1835): synonym of Morlina glabra (Rossmässler, 1835)
 Oxychilus inopinatus (Uličný, 1887): synonym of Mediterranea inopinata (Uličný, 1887) (unaccepted combination)

References

External links

 Giusti F. & Manganelli G. (2002). "Redescription of two west European Oxychilus species: O. alliarius (Miller, 1822) and O. helveticus (Blum, 1881), and notes on the systematics of Oxychilus Fitzinger, 1833 (Gastropoda: Pulmonata: Zonitidae)". Journal of Conchology 37(5): 455–476. abstract.

 
Gastropod genera